Toulouse Tech, the Toulouse Institute of Technology is one of the grandes écoles network in France. It was created in 2007. It gathers 16 French grandes écoles, covering engineering science, management, architecture and veterinary, aiming to be of comparable status to the most famous universities of technology around the world.

Colleges and institutes
 École nationale de l'aviation civile
 École nationale supérieure de formation de l’enseignement agricole
 École nationale d'ingénieurs de Tarbes
 École nationale de la météorologie
 École nationale supérieure d'architecture de Toulouse
 École nationale supérieure en génie des technologies industrielles
 École des mines d'Albi-Carmaux
 École nationale vétérinaire de Toulouse
 École d'ingénieurs de Purpan
 Institut catholique d'arts et métiers
 École Nationale Supérieure Agronomique de Toulouse
 École Nationale Supérieure d'Électronique, d'Électrotechnique, d'Informatique, d'Hydraulique et des Télécommunications
 École nationale supérieure des ingénieurs en arts chimiques et technologiques
 Institut National des Sciences Appliquées de Toulouse
 Institut Supérieur de l'Aéronautique et de l'Espace

Facts and figures
From the official website:

 850 teachers-researchers
 14,000 students
 22 million euros in research

References

External links
 Toulouse Tech
 Toulouse Formation
 Trouver une formation à Toulouse

 
Universities and colleges in Toulouse
Technical universities and colleges in France
Toulouse
Educational institutions established in 2007
2007 establishments in France